William A. Hillman was a college football player for Louisiana State University and an executive with the Chrysler Corporation in Detroit.

College football
Hillman attended Minden High School. He was a center  for the 1908 LSU Tigers football team which went 10–0 and was selected as national champion by the National Championship Foundation. He backed up Robert L. Stovall. Hillman scored a touchdown in the game against Texas A&M. He was selected All-Southern by Nash Buckingham of the Memphis Commercial Appeal in 1908.

References

Sportspeople from Minden, Louisiana
All-Southern college football players
LSU Tigers football players
American football centers
Players of American football from Louisiana
American football guards
Chrysler people
1884 births
Minden High School (Minden, Louisiana) alumni
Year of death missing